The Bismarck Archipelago is a group of islands off the northeastern coast of New Guinea in the western Pacific Ocean and is part of the Islands Region of Papua New Guinea. Its area is about 50,000 square km.

History
The first inhabitants of the archipelago arrived around 30,000–40,000 years ago. They may have traveled from New Guinea, by boat across the Bismarck Sea or via a temporary land bridge, created by an uplift in the Earth's crust. Later arrivals included the Lapita people.

The first European to visit these islands was Dutch explorer Willem Schouten in 1616. The islands remained unsettled by western Europeans until they were annexed as part of the German protectorate of German New Guinea in 1884. The area was named in honour of the Chancellor Otto von Bismarck.

On 13 March 1888, a volcano erupted on Ritter Island causing a megatsunami. Almost the entire volcano fell into the ocean, leaving a small crater lake.

Following the outbreak of World War I, the Australian Naval and Military Expeditionary Force seized the islands in 1914 and Australia later received a League of Nations mandate for the islands. They remained under Australian administration—interrupted only by Japanese occupation during World War II—until Papua New Guinea became independent in September 1975.

Geography
The archipelago encompasses the Bismarck Sea and sits upon the North Bismarck Plate, the Manus Plate and the South Bismarck Plate.

Islands are grouped here according to administrative province:

 Manus Province (see 9 on the map)
 Admiralty Islands, group of 18 islands including:
 Manus Island, main island
 Los Negros Island
 Lou Island
 Ndrova Island
 Tong Island
 Baluan Island
 Pak Island
 Purdy Islands
 Rambutyo Island
 St. Andrews Islands
 Western Islands, with:
 Aua Island
 Hermit Islands
 Kaniet Islands (Anchorite)
 Sae Island
 Ninigo Islands
 Wuvulu Island
 New Ireland Province (12)
 New Ireland or also Niu Ailan, main island
 New Hanover or Lavongai
 St Matthias Islands
 Tabar Group
 Lihir Group
 Tanga Group
 Feni Islands
 Dyaul Island
 East New Britain Province (4)
 New Britain or also Niu Briten, main island
 Duke of York Islands
 Kabakon
 Ulu
 West New Britain Province (18)
 New Britain or also Niu Briten, main island
 Vitu Islands
 Morobe Province (11)
 Umboi Island
 Tolokiwa Island
 Sakar Island
 Ritter Island
 Malai Island
 Tuam Island
 Madang Province (8)
 Long Island
 Crown Island
 Karkar Island
 Bagabag Island
 Manam
 East Sepik Province (5)
 Schouten Islands

The passage of water between the islands of New Britain and New Ireland is called St. George's Channel after St. George's Channel in the British Isles between Wales and Ireland.

See also

 List of islands of Papua New Guinea

Notes

Bibliography
 Firth, Stewart (1983). New Guinea Under the Germans. Carlton, Australia: Melbourne University Press. .
 Howe, K. R., Robert C. Kiste, Brij V. Lal, eds. (1994). Tides of History: The Pacific Islands in the Twentieth Century. Honolulu: University of Hawaii Press. .
 King, David et al. (1982). Papua New Guinea Atlas: A Nation in Transition. Bathurst, Australia: R. Brown and the University of Papua New Guinea. .
 Moore, Clive (2003). New Guinea: Crossing Boundaries and History. Honolulu: University of Hawaii Press. .
 Ryan, Peter, ed. (1972). Encyclopedia of Papua New Guinea. 3 volumes; Vol I: A – K, maps, black and white illustrations, xv + 588pp. Vol II: l – Z, maps, black and white illustrations, 589–1231pp. Vol III: Index, folding colour map in rear pocket, map, colour illustration, v + 83pp. Carlton, Australia: Melbourne University Press. .

External links

 
 

 
Archipelagoes of Papua New Guinea
Islands Region (Papua New Guinea)
Bismarck Sea
Archipelagoes of Oceania
Archipelagoes of the Pacific Ocean
Lists of islands of Papua New Guinea
1884 establishments in German New Guinea
1914 disestablishments in German New Guinea
1914 establishments in Australia
1975 disestablishments in Australia
1975 establishments in Papua New Guinea
Freshwater ecoregions